Tiffany Williams (née Ross; born 5 February 1983 in Miami, Florida) is an American hurdler who is a  former US 400m hurdles champion in 2007 and 2008.

She had a standout collegiate career at the University of South Carolina, as SEC champion 3 years in a row and a 15 time all American.

She finished fourth at the 2002 World Junior Championships and second at the 2006 World Athletics Final. In addition she won a silver medal in 4 x 400 metres relay at the 2006 World Indoor Championships. She qualified for the 2008 US Olympic team by winning the final of the 400 m hurdles at the 2008 US Olympic Trials in Eugene, Oregon.

Her personal best time for the 400 m hurdles is 53.28 seconds, achieved in June 2007 in Indianapolis.

Williams returned to form in 2012 running 55.01 her fastest time in 3 years in a meeting in Turkey.

References

External links
 
 Profile at USA Track & Field
 (http://www.tiffanymwilliams.com/) Official Website

1983 births
Living people
American female hurdlers
Athletes (track and field) at the 2008 Summer Olympics
Olympic track and field athletes of the United States
Track and field athletes from Miami
African-American female track and field athletes
South Carolina Gamecocks women's track and field athletes
World Athletics Indoor Championships medalists
21st-century African-American sportspeople
21st-century African-American women
20th-century African-American people
20th-century African-American women